Nowinki may refer to the following places:
Nowinki, Łódź Voivodeship (central Poland)
Nowinki, Łuków County in Lublin Voivodeship (east Poland)
Nowinki, Tomaszów Lubelski County in Lublin Voivodeship (east Poland)
Nowinki, Piaseczno County in Masovian Voivodeship (east-central Poland)
Nowinki, Wołomin County in Masovian Voivodeship (east-central Poland)
Nowinki, Greater Poland Voivodeship (west-central Poland)
Nowinki, Kartuzy County in Pomeranian Voivodeship (north Poland)
Nowinki, Nowy Dwór Gdański County in Pomeranian Voivodeship (north Poland)